The 2003 Nigerian Senate election in Ogun State was held on April 12, 2003, to elect members of the Nigerian Senate to represent Ogun State. Ibikunle Amosun representing Ogun Central, Olatokunbo Ogunbanjo representing Ogun East and Iyabo Anisulowo representing Ogun West all won on the platform of the Peoples Democratic Party.

Overview

Summary

Results

Ogun Central 
The election was won by Ibikunle Amosun of the Peoples Democratic Party.

Ogun East 
The election was won by Olatokunbo Ogunbanjo of the Peoples Democratic Party.

Ogun West 
The election was won by Iyabo Anisulowo of the Peoples Democratic Party.

References 

April 2003 events in Nigeria
Ogun State Senate elections
Ogu